Acrocercops euthycolona is a moth of the family Gracillariidae, known from Maharashtra, India, as well as Brunei Darussalam, Indonesia, Malaysia, the Solomon Islands, Sri Lanka, and Vanuatu. It was described by Edward Meyrick in 1931.

The hostplants for the species include Anacardium occidentale, Madhuca indica, Madhuca latifolia, Mimusops elengi, and Mimusops elengi. They mine the leaves of their host plant. The mine has the form of a large ovate blotch mine under the upper cuticle of the leaf. It is pinkish, shining and opaque.

References

euthycolona
Moths of Asia
Moths described in 1931